Fariman is a city in Razavi Khorasan Province, Iran.

Fariman may also refer to:
Fariman, North Khorasan
Fariman, Joghatai, Razavi Khorasan Province
Fariman County, in Razavi Khorasan Province
Fariman Rural District